The Pindad G2 is a 9×19mm Parabellum handgun designed and produced by Pindad.

The name "G2" is pronounced in English and is meant to be a pun for the Indonesian word "jitu" (literally means "accurate").

History
On June 1, 2018, Pindad announced that it has entered into a partnership with Bhukhanvala Industries to market the G2 to Indian military and law enforcement agencies.

Design details 

The Pindad G2 Combat Pistol is a recoil-operated semi-automatic handgun utilizing a John Browning-style tilting barrel mechanism. This mechanism harnesses the recoil of the fired round to push the slide rearwards.

As the slide moves to the rear, it: a.) Ejects the spent cartridge case, b.) Compresses the recoil spring, c.) Tilts the breech end of the barrel down to receive a new round and d.) Cocks the hammer.

The slide is then pushed forward by the recoil spring. As the slide moves forward, it: a.) Extracts a new round from the magazine and b.) Pushes the round into the chamber and c.) Tilts the breech end of the barrel up into battery under the action of a cam on the barrel. The tilting action locks the breech to the slide.

Since the firearm is single-action only, the hammer cannot be cocked by squeezing the trigger, but must initially be cocked to fire the first round by manually cycling the slide. Since this pistol has an exposed hammer, the hammer can also be manually cocked for a second strike in the event of a misfire.

Users

 : Used by Bruneian soldiers due to compete in the AARM 2020 competition.
 : Standard issue sidearm.

References

External links 
https://web.archive.org/web/20130403233215/http://www.pindad.com/showpro1.php?p=85&u=1&m=2&b=2

9mm Parabellum semi-automatic pistols
Semi-automatic pistols of Indonesia